Time Out for Rhythm is a 1941 musical comedy film directed by Sidney Salkow and starring Rudy Vallée, Ann Miller and the Three Stooges (Moe Howard, Larry Fine, and Curly Howard). Six Hits and a Miss perform, as well as Glen Gray and His Casa Loma Orchestra, and Eduardo Durant's Rhumba Band, and with eight original songs by Saul Chaplin and Sammy Cahn.

Plot
Harvard educated Danny Collins (Rudy Vallée) and street-wise Mike Armstrong (Richard Lane) team up after a chance meeting to form the most successful talent agency in New York City. Mike is in love with nightclub and Broadway songstress Frances Lewis (Rosemary Lane), determined to make her nationally famous with his and Danny's help. Danny sees her, correctly, as a self-centered opportunist willing to capitalize on Mike's affections to further her career.

Eventually, she causes Danny and Mike to split. Around the same time Danny and his assistant 'Off-Beat' Davis meet Frances' maid Kitty Brown (Ann Miller), a shy tap-dancing wonder, and try to find her work... but without Mike, their new agency cannot get going successfully. Mike is not having any luck on his own either, despite the fact he and Frances are now engaged
to be married.

When Danny has the opportunity to produce a New York-based variety show with Kitty and Joan Merrill (as herself) as the headliners, he and Mike finally make amends when he needs Mike's help to seal the deal. But Frances blackmails Danny, threatening to break Mike's heart if she is not cast as the star of the show. Mike eventually learns about this and finally sees Frances for who she really is and leaves her. Mike moves forward, with Danny as his friend and business partner once again, to work on the show starring Kitty.

The film's musical finale begins with the Stooges (with help from co-stars Brenda and Cobrina) performing a hilarious rhumba dance number, with Curly Howard dressed up as Carmen Miranda.

Cast

Production notes
The Three Stooges made appearances as out-of-work actors trying to find jobs through Danny's and Mike's agency. The Stooges provided most of the laughs as they appear throughout the movie. They showcased their famous "Maharaja" routine here for the first time, which later reused in their 1946 short subject Three Little Pirates as well as several other bits, including "Melodrama" routine from their era with Ted Healy which can also be seen at MGM-era short Plane Nuts (1933).

Alan Hale, Jr., best known for his role as The Skipper on Gilligan's Island, also makes a brief appearance, marking one of his first film appearances.

Home media
For many years, Time Out for Rhythm remained the only Columbia feature-length film with bit parts from the Stooges unavailable in DVD format (it never saw a VHS release). Sony Pictures Home Entertainment finally gave the film a DVD release on August 7, 2012, as part of its manufactured-on-demand Columbia Choice Collection series. On February 4, 2014, Mill Creek Entertainment released the film on Blu-Ray as part of the six-movie set The Three Stooges Collection.

External links 
 
 

1941 films
1941 musical comedy films
American musical comedy films
American black-and-white films
1940s English-language films
American films based on plays
Films directed by Sidney Salkow
Films scored by Morris Stoloff
The Three Stooges films
Columbia Pictures films
1940s American films